is a Japanese businessperson and former singer and actress. She is a former member of AKB48, and has founded two companies aiming to provide second career options for aspiring and active entertainers.

Biography 
Shimada joined AKB48 in 2009. During her time with the group, she had served as the vice-captain of Team K. In April 2017, Shimada announced that she would graduate from the group in September 2017 and retire from the entertainment industry. Her graduation live concert was held on November 13, and she released her photo book the same month. She posted her farewell message on her official Twitter and Instagram accounts on December 31, 2017 and stated that she will only maintain her Instagram account going forward.

In 2018, Shimada moved to London and lived there for about a year to learn English. She worked at an advertising agency after returning to Japan, and went on to establish the company Dct Inc. in May 2021. Drawing from her own experiences, the company offers courses to prepare Japanese idols for the general workforce should they decide to retire from the entertainment industry, considering that they often start out while in school and have little or no work experience outside the industry such as part-time work, although they might have an advantage in communication skills. Former AKB48 members have enrolled in the courses, three of whom found employment in January 2022. She later established a second company named Clover Academy, which offers a combined course of performing arts training and child care qualification for high school graduates who aspire to enter show business, similarly to provide an option for a second career should they later retire.

Shimada also helps manage her family's ryokan, Tachibana, in her hometown of Atami. After the 2021 Atami landslide, she launched a crowdfunding project for reconstruction of the affected areas, which managed to collect 3,331,000 yen.

AKB48 participation

Singles

Albums

Other songs

Stage units

Filmography

TV dramas

Variety

Other TV programmes (mainly tennis related)

Stage

Radio

Films

Events

Internet

Bibliography

Books

Calendars

References

Notes

Sources

External links
 Official Instagram account 
 on 755 
Dct.inc 
Clover Academy 

AKB48 members
Japanese idols
21st-century Japanese actresses
Musicians from Shizuoka Prefecture
Living people
1992 births